William M. Nickerson (born December 6, 1933) is an inactive Senior United States district judge of the United States District Court for the District of Maryland.

Education and career

Born in Baltimore, Maryland, Nickerson received a Bachelor of Arts degree from the University of Virginia in 1955 and a Bachelor of Laws from the University of Maryland School of Law in 1962. He was a United States Coast Guard Lieutenant from 1955 to 1959. He was in private practice in Baltimore from 1962 to 1985. He was an Associate Judge of the Circuit Court for Baltimore County, Maryland from 1985 to 1990.

Federal judicial service

Nickerson was nominated by President George H. W. Bush on January 24, 1990, to a seat on the United States District Court for the District of Maryland vacated by Juge Herbert Frazier Murray. He was confirmed by the United States Senate on May 11, 1990, and received his commission on May 14, 1990. He assumed senior status on June 11, 2002.

References

Sources

1933 births
Living people
Lawyers from Baltimore
Military personnel from Baltimore
Judges of the United States District Court for the District of Maryland
United States district court judges appointed by George H. W. Bush
20th-century American judges
United States Coast Guard officers
University of Maryland Francis King Carey School of Law alumni
University of Virginia alumni
21st-century American judges